Ghizlane Toudali (born February 16, 1984) is a Moroccan taekwondo practitioner. Toudali qualified for the women's 49 kg class at the 2008 Summer Olympics in Beijing, after placing second from the African Qualification Tournament in Tripoli, Libya. She lost the preliminary round of sixteen match to Iran's Sara Khoshjamal, who was able to score five points at the end of the game.

References

External links

NBC Olympics Profile

Moroccan female taekwondo practitioners
1984 births
Living people
Olympic taekwondo practitioners of Morocco
Taekwondo practitioners at the 2008 Summer Olympics
20th-century Moroccan women
21st-century Moroccan women